On 6 August 2019, the Government of India revoked the special status, or autonomy, granted under Article 370 of the Indian Constitution to Jammu and Kashmir—a region administered by India as a state which consists of the larger part of Kashmir which has been the subject of dispute among India, Pakistan, and China since 1947.

Among the Indian government actions accompanying the revocation was the cutting off of communication lines in the Kashmir Valley restored after 5 months. Thousands of additional security forces were deployed to curb any uprising. Several leading Kashmiri politicians were taken into custody, including the former chief minister. Government officials described these restrictions as designed for preempting violence, and justified the revocation for enabling people of the state to access government programmes such as reservation, right to education and right to information.

The reactions in the Muslim majority Kashmir Valley, where Hindu population is negligible due to 1990 exodus of Kashmiri Hindus, was effectively suppressed through the suspension of communication and with imposition of Curfew (Section 144). Many nationalists celebrated, declaring the move to herald public order and prosperity in Kashmir. Among political parties in India, the revocation was supported by the ruling Bharatiya Janata Party, and, among others, by the Bahujan Samaj Party, the Aam Aadmi Party, AIADMK, Telugu Desam Party, YSR Congress Party, BJD, Janata Dal (United) and the Shiv Sena. It was opposed by the Indian National Congress, Jammu & Kashmir National Conference, Jammu and Kashmir Peoples Democratic Party, Communist Party of India (Marxist), Communist Party of India, Trinamool Congress and the DMK. In Ladakh, people in the Kargil area, who are Shia Muslim and form the plurality of the population of Ladakh, protested; however, the Buddhist community in Ladakh supported the decision.

The President of India issued an order under the power of Article 370, overriding the prevailing 1954 Presidential Order and nullifying all the provisions of autonomy granted to the state. The Home Minister introduced a Reorganisation Bill in the Indian Parliament, seeking to divide the state into two union territories to be governed by a lieutenant governor and a unicameral legislature. The resolution seeking the revocation of the temporary special status under Article 370 and the bill for the state's reorganisation was debated and passed by the Rajya Sabha – India's upper house of parliament – on 5 August 2019. On 6 August, the Lok Sabha – India's lower house of parliament – debated and passed the reorganisation bill along with the resolution recommending the revocation.

Background 

Article 370 of the Indian constitution gave special status to Jammu and Kashmir — a state in India, located in the northern part of the Indian subcontinent, and a part of the larger region of Kashmir, which has been the subject of dispute between India, Pakistan and China. The Article conferred power on Jammu and Kashmir to have a separate constitution, a state flag and autonomy over the internal administration of the state. The Constituent Assembly of Jammu and Kashmir, after its establishment, was empowered to recommend the articles of the Indian constitution that should be applied to the state or to abrogate the Article 370 altogether. After consultation with the state's Constituent Assembly, the 1954 Presidential Order was issued, specifying the articles of the Indian constitution that applied to the state. The Constituent Assembly dissolved itself without recommending the abrogation of Article 370, the article was deemed to have become a permanent feature of the Indian Constitution. This article, along with Article 35A, defined that the Jammu and Kashmir state's residents live under a separate set of laws, including those related to citizenship, ownership of property, and fundamental rights, as compared to residents of other Indian states.

Under various Indian National Congress party-led central governments and locally elected state governments — such as those of the National Conference — between 1954 and 2011, India used the provisions of Article 370 to issue presidential orders to extend the Indian constitution to Jammu and Kashmir with the concurrence of the State Government, and reduce the state's autonomy. These past Presidential orders under Article 370 are also controversial and a subject of the Kashmir dispute. Political scientist Sumantra Bose, a Kashmir scholar, sums up the politics of the period 1953–63, during which Bakshi Ghulam Mohammad served as the Prime Minister of Jammu and Kashmir in these words: Bakshi Ghulam Mohammed’s term in office lasted a full decade, until October 1963. The sequence of events during that decade strongly suggests a contractual relationship between Bakshi and the government of India, whereby he would be allowed to run an unrepresentative, unaccountable government in Srinagar in return for facilitating IJK’s "integration" with India on New Delhi’s terms. The result was twofold: a crippling of rule of law and democratic institutions in IJK; and an erosion of IJK’s autonomy, achieved (as required by Article 370) with the "concurrence" of IJK’s government—which consisted of a motley clique of New Delhi's client politicians." Further, in Bose's view, the 1954 Presidential order and the subsequent orders began "the end for the Article 370" and it has "effectively been dead in letter and in spirit since that time".

Since the partition of India and Pakistan on religious lines, the Hindutva organizations in India have stated that Jammu and Kashmir is an integral, inseparable part of India. As in past election manifestos, the Bharatiya Janata Party included the integration of Jammu and Kashmir among its campaign promises for the 2019 Indian general election. The BJP and its allies won a landslide majority in the Lok Sabha, the lower house of the Indian Parliament. On 5 August 2019, India issued a Presidential order superseding the 1954 order that made all the provisions of the Indian constitution applicable to Jammu and Kashmir. Following the resolutions passed in both houses of the parliament, the President of India issued a further order on 6 August declaring all the clauses of Article 370 except clause 1 to be inoperative.

On 5 August 2019, some political parties of Jammu and Kashmir met at the home of Farooq Abdullah and released a joint statement, called Gupkar Declaration, that pledged to defend and safeguard the identity, autonomy and special status of Jammu and Kashmir.

Legal aspects 

Article 370 of the Constitution of India was a 'temporary provision' inserted on 17 October 1949 which gave special powers to the state of Jammu and Kashmir, lawfully authorising it to have its own constitution. Accordingly, the provisions of only Article 1 and Article 370 of the Indian Constitution applied to the state. So, for the Central government to extend the coverage of a central law to the state on subjects included in the Instrument of Accession (IoA), it needed "consultation" while for extending the coverage of laws on other subjects, it needed "concurrence" of the state government. Similarly, Article 35A of the Constitution of India, introduced through a constitutional order in 1954, authorised the state legislature to define 'permanent residents'. Those defined as permanent residents were entitled to property rights, employment, scholarships and other social benefits in the state.

After the 1954 order, forty-seven Presidential orders were issued between 11 February 1956 and 19 February 1994, making various other provisions of the Constitution of India applicable to Jammu and Kashmir. All these orders were issued with the 'concurrence of the Government of the State' without any Constituent Assembly. Some of these Presidential orders were issued when the state was under President's rule and had "no Kashmir government at all", states Jill Cottrell. The effect of the Presidential orders issued between 1954 and 1994 had been to extend 94 of the 97 subjects in the Union List (the powers of the Central Government), and 260 of the 395 Articles of the Constitution of India to the State of Jammu and Kashmir.

Government approach 
In April 2018, the Supreme Court of India ruled that Article 370 had attained permanency since the state constituent assembly has ceased to exist. To overcome this legal challenge, the Indian government instead rendered Article 370 as 'inoperative' even though it still exists in the constitution. On 5 August, a presidential order was issued – the Constitution (Application to Jammu and Kashmir) Order, 2019 – which superseded the Constitution (Application to Jammu and Kashmir) Order, 1954.

The August 2019 Presidential order stated that all the provisions of the Indian Constitution applied to Jammu and Kashmir. This in effect meant that the separate Constitution of Jammu and Kashmir stood abrogated, and a single constitution now applied to all the Indian states. The President issued the order with the "concurrence of the Government of State of Jammu and Kashmir". This in effect meant the concurrence of the Governor of Jammu and Kashmir since President's rule was imposed at that time in the state. The order was issued using the third clause of Article 370, which authorised the President of India to declare the article inoperative with exceptions and modifications, if recommended by the (non-existent) state constituent assembly to do so. To circumvent the legal issue of the non-existent state constituent assembly, the President used the Clause (I) of Article 370, which conferred him with the power to modify the Indian Constitution on subjects related to Jammu and Kashmir. So he first added a new clause to Article 367, which deals with interpretation of the Constitution. He replaced the phrase 'Constituent Assembly of the State' with 'Legislative Assembly of the State'. Since the state legislative assembly has been suspended, the order says that any reference to the legislative assembly will be construed as a reference to the Governor of Jammu and Kashmir. The governor is an appointee of the Central government. Therefore, the Indian Parliament now functions for the state legislative assembly.

Hence, the Indian Home Minister moved a resolution in the Rajya Sabha to give the President the necessary recommendation he needs to declare Article 370 as inoperative. Subsequently, the statutory resolution seeking the revocation of the special status under Article 370 and the bill for the state's reorganisation was debated and passed by the Rajya Sabha on 5 August 2019 with 125 (67%) votes in its favour and 61 (33%) against it. On 6 August, the bill for the reorganisation was debated and passed by the Lok Sabha with 370 (86%) votes in its favour and 70 (14%) against it, and the resolution recommending the revocation was passed by 351 votes in favour and 72 against.

Petitions against abrogation 

On 28 August 2019, the Supreme Court of India agreed to hear multiple petitions challenging the abrogation of Article 370 and the subsequent bifurcation of Jammu and Kashmir into two union territories. It constituted a five-judge bench for the same. The court also issued notices to the government, seeking a reply to the petitions, whereby declining pleas by the government which argued that the notices could be cited in international forums such as the United Nations. Additionally, the court ordered the government to reply within seven days to a petition seeking an end to the restrictions on communications as well as other restrictions in the region.

The Supreme Court heard the petitions on 30 September 2019. It allowed the central government to submit its replies to the petitions in 30 days and fixed 14 November 2019 as the next date of hearing. The petitioners wanted the court to issue an injunction against reorganisation of the state into two union territories but the court declined to issue any injunction. This means that the two union territories came into existence on 31 October 2019 as planned.

Legal Scholars 
In an article for the Indian Law Review, Balu G. Nair noted the orders to be "constitutionally suspect". Deva Zaid finds the orders to be extra-constitutional. Rajeev Dhavan opined that Art. 370 can't be "abrogated". Gautam Bhatia found the entire episode to be fraught with legal and constitutional defects. Suhrith Parthasarathy opined the orders to be unconstitutional.

Government clampdown 

Prior to the revocation of the status, the Ministry of Home Affairs granted approval for the mobilization of thousands of paramilitary security troops into Jammu and Kashmir, citing reason to maintain law and order in the area. On 2 August, Indian Army said that the Pakistan Army and terrorists are "planning to upscale violence" and tried to "target the Yatra recently." The Government of India notified students and tourists, both local and foreign, to leave Jammu and Kashmir. These actions sparked fears that India would soon be revoking Jammu and Kashmir's special status. However, on 3 August, Omar Abdullah said that Governor Satya Pal Malik "assured him there was no initiative in progress to dilute Article 35A of the Constitution, start delimitation or trifurcate."

On 4 August, satellite phones were distributed in central, north and south Kashmir among the security forces. The government thereafter ordered a total communication blackout, shutting down cable TV, landlines, cellphones and the Internet. Many news sources reported an effective curfew (although The Telegraph of Kolkata reports that the government did not officially announce a curfew). Doctors and district administrators were advised to remain on standby.

Prior to the 5 August revocation announcement, Section 144 curfew was imposed in the Muslim-majority Kashmir Valley, the Hindu-majority Jammu region and the Muslim & Buddhist populated Ladakh region. The current lockdown was far more intense in the Srinagar (Kashmir) region, where "people are used to curfews and living under a heavy security presence", according to The Guardian newspaper. Concrete barricades blocked roads every few hundred meters. Shops and clinics were closed, as were all educational institutions and a red alert was sounded across Jammu and Kashmir. The government lifted Section 144 curfew and reopened schools in some Jammu region districts effective 10 August 2019.

Many Indian media reported that they had no information coming from the Kashmir Valley and could not even ascertain if their correspondents were safe or not. Journalists were not issued curfew passes. The Committee to Protect Journalists (CPJ) reported that Qazi Shibli – a local journalist and editor of news website The Kashmiriyat Walla, was arrested by the Jammu and Kashmir Police on 28 July 2019 on unspecified charges, but it was unclear on 5 August 2019 if he is still under arrest. Many journalists reported being stopped by soldiers and others stated they had to send photos out of the state via USB flash drives. A local journalist told CPJ that "I fear that they will arrest journalists, especially those who will report what is happening". CPJ later reported that at least 2 journalists were detained amid tensions in Jammu and Kashmir.

In addition to local Kashmiri journalists, editors of several Indian newspapers and television stations complained that their teams have not been able to send in their reports from most of the Muslim-majority Kashmir Valley, except for a few blocks in Srinagar. However, the managing editor of the Indian Times Now English news channel, Navika Kumar said, "her channel had not faced much restriction broadcasting from Kashmir and reporters were sending feeds through satellite-linked outside broadcasting vans", according to Reuters. The Times Now and other media groups of India have been criticized as "conformist" and alleged to "look like they are afraid of the government" by H. K. Dua – a former media advisor of two former Indian prime ministers.

More than 4,000 Kashmiri protesters were reported to be arrested by 18 August, including several Kashmiri leaders to prevent any protest or outbreak of violence. This figure was about 500 by 9 August. Jammu and Kashmir's former chief ministers Mehbooba Mufti and Omar Abdullah, and MLAs Mohammed Yousuf Tarigami and Engineer Rashid were among those placed under "preventive detention" by the security forces.

In January 2020, Human Rights Watch reported that the Indian government-imposed clampdown in Kashmir is being slowly and gradually eased of restrictions, but to a large extent continues to fail in preserving the rights of the Kashmiri people. The lawyers, shop keepers, rights activists, students, who had been under arrest have been released, but on the condition of never criticising the government in the future again. Meanwhile, some notable political figures including former chief ministers, too, continue to remain in custody.

Government's rationale 

India's Foreign minister Subrahmanyam Jaishankar defended the clampdown saying that this was done to prevent an outbreak of violence and civilian casualties, citing the unrest caused after the death of militant Burhan Wani in 2016. He said that it was not possible to stop communication among militants without putting the entire region under a blackout.

The Government of Jammu and Kashmir stated that the restrictions on Internet access, among other restrictions, were imposed to preempt the disruption of public order by various "anti-national" elements. It said that the misuse of data services and Internet by "terrorists" to conduct terrorism and to incite people by spreading fake news necessitated such restrictions, which will be gradually reduced.

Restoration of services

On 16 August, B. V. R. Subrahmanyam – the chief secretary of Jammu and Kashmir, announced that the government will lift lockdown and remove some restrictions in a phased manner in the Kashmir Valley. According to Reuters, telephone services were to be resumed in parts of Srinagar on 16 August 2019, only to face delays in implementation. Landline phone services, indicated Subrahmanyam, would be restored in most of Srinagar by 18 August 2019. Central government was adamant about reopening schools in the valley in the week of 19 August 2019 amid curfew-like situation. However, when some schools were opened in the valley, several media reported that children did not go to schools at all. According to Subrahmanyam, "12 of 22 [Jammu and Kashmir] districts were already functioning normally, and measures have been put in place to ensure zero loss of lives on any side or serious injuries to anyone. Telecom connectivity will be eased and restored in a phased manner keeping in mind the constant threat by terror organizations".

As of 25 August 2019, landline services were restored in most places in the Kashmir Valley. On September 4, only 50,000 landline connections were operational throughout the valley. On 14 October 2019, postpaid mobile phone services were fully restored in the region. As of 3 January 2020, mobile Internet has still not been fully restored in the region. At 153 days and counting, this has become the largest internet shutdown in India.

On 13 January 2020, an article by Reuters reported that the Internet services have not been fully restored in Kashmir, forcing Kashmiris to board a crowded train – dubbed as the 'Internet Express' – to travel to a nearby town of Banihal for using Internet at cybercafes for 300 rupees ($4.20) an hour. The Vice President of the Kashmir Chamber of Commerce and Industry, Majeed Mir, claims almost 500,000 jobs have been lost since the blockade, stating that "irreversible damage has been caused to the economy".

On 14 January 2020, broadband Internet services were restored to select organizations/individuals in the Kashmir Valley and 2G mobile services were restored in five districts located in the Jammu region.

On 18 January 2020, 2G Internet service was restored for 153 white listed websites in all the 10 districts of Jammu Division and in 2 districts Kupwara and Bandipura of Kashmir Valley for postpaid mobile service. Voice call and SMS services were also restored for the whole Union Territory.

On 25 January 2020, 2G Internet services were restored for all 20 districts on both pre-paid and postpaid mobiles for 301 white-listed websites.

As of 26 February 2020, broadband Internet services remain banned to the general public. Until 4 March 2020, the number of whitelisted websites were increased. Still only 2G Internet service was accessible. On 4 March 2020, Internet services were fully restored but restricted to 2G Internet speed.

From July 2020, the Indian Union government will allow Indian security forces to buy land in certain areas of the Indian administered Kashmir. This is a reversal from an earlier policy, where the Indian security forces had to request special permission to buy land in the area. Only locals were able to buy land in Indian administered Kashmir, however, with the government scrapping Kashmir's autonomy, Indian security forces can buy land and live in Kashmir.

On 16 August 2020, high speed mobile internet services (4G/LTE) were restored in two districts of the union territory of J&K on a trial basis, after Supreme Court of India ruled last month that indefinite shutdown was illegal.

Legal scrutiny 

In a verdict delivered on petitions filed against the restrictions imposed in Jammu and Kashmir, the Supreme Court ordered a review of all the curbs on usage of Internet services. The court pointed out that freedom to access Internet services is a fundamental right as per Article 19(1) of the Indian Constitution. It also noted that Section 144 of India's Code of Criminal Procedure is not to be used for suppressing people's expression, ordering the local administration to publish every usage of that provision to enable its public scrutiny.

Reactions to clampdown 

 – Alice Wells, the Assistant Secretary of State for South and Central Asian Affairs, said in a statement that the US hopes "to see rapid action – the lifting of the restrictions and the release of those who have been detained". She added that the US is "concerned by widespread detentions, including those of politicians and business leaders, and the restrictions on the residents of Jammu and Kashmir". US lawmakers Ilhan Omar, Rashida Tlaib and Alexandria Ocasio-Cortez also called for an end to the communications blockade.
Amnesty International – The NGO for human rights started an online petition titled Let Kashmir Speak demanding a lifting of "the blackout of communications in Jammu and Kashmir" while letting "the voices of the people of Kashmir be heard" and allowing "unconditional and unconstrained access to news and information from the valley".

Reactions from the affected areas

Opposition

The most recent Chief Minister of Jammu and Kashmir, Mehbooba Mufti called it the "blackest day of Indian democracy". She felt that the Indian Parliament snatched away everything from the people of Jammu and Kashmir. In a tweet on 4 August 2019, she said that the decision of Jammu and Kashmir leadership to reject two-nation theory in 1947 and align with India had backfired.

Former chief minister Omar Abdullah called the government's move on the Article 370 "unilateral and shocking". He deemed it a "total betrayal of the trust that the people of Jammu and Kashmir had reposed in India when the state acceded to it in 1947".

Asgar Ali Karbalai, former Chief Executive Councillor of Kargil's Hill Development Council, said people in Kargil considered any division of the state on the grounds of "religion, language or region" as undemocratic. Certain religious and political organisations in Kargil, including the Imam Khomeini Memorial Trust, condemned the Indian government for acting "without the consent from the people" and called for a general strike in the Kargil district.

Kashmiri politician Shah Faesal denounced the move, saying that "This is being seen as the biggest betrayal by the Indian state in last 70 years. It was not possible to reach Omar Abdullah, Mehbooba Mufti, Sajjad Gani Lone or send a message to them. In other districts, curfew is all the more strict. You can say that the entire eight-million population has been incarcerated like never before," and in an interview with The Guardian, described that the revocation of Jammu and Kashmir's special status was "an insult to the dignity of the people. My belief is that it will have immediate and long-term consequences. We will see ground mobilisation in the coming days and in the long run you will have sentiment of alienation going further and [it will] erupt. The common refrain is that everything has finished. Everything has been snatched from us. These are the common lines on every Kashmiri's lips these days. We have no choice left but to resist." Faesal was apparently detained by Indian security forces on 14 August 2019, leading to a statement by over 100 people associated with Harvard University (his alma mater) condemning the detention and calling for the release of Faesal and other Kashmiri leaders.

Support

The member of the Lok Sabha for Ladakh constituency, Jamyang Tsering Namgyal, praised the abrogation of Article 370 and the proposed formation of a separate Ladakh union territory, hoping the move will encourage jobs and development. He added "Under Kashmir, our development, our political aspiration, our identity, our language, if all of this got lost, it is because of Article 370—and the Congress party is responsible for that". Namgyal also said that the move had support from all regions of Ladakh, including Kargil.

The move to abrogate Article 370 and establish a union territory in Ladakh was welcomed by the Ladakh Buddhist Association who then organised a thanksgiving celebration in Leh to on 8 August 2019, which was attended by political and religious leaders. The Buddhist community in Leh and Ladakh stated they have been long ignored, the revocation and reorganisation will help them steer their own destiny.

Many local political parties and groups, such as the Kashmiri Hindu organisation Panun Kashmir, Jammu and Kashmir Workers Party and IkkJutt Jammu lauded the removal of Article 370 and 35A and the integration of Jammu and Kashmir.

It was reported that celebrations had taken place in Jammu with people distributing sweets, dancing and playing drums.

Representatives of the Kashmiri Hindu Community, who were displaced from the Kashmir Valley as a result of ongoing violence welcomed the move and hoped that members of their community, numbering between 300,000 and 400,000 people will be able to return.

The day of 15 August was marked by Ladakh as its 'first independence day'. Banners were put up thanking the prime minister Narendra Modi and commemorating the four youth activists who died while agitating for union territory status. Similar celebrations were also noticed in Jammu among the Gujjar Bakarwals, Sikhs, Valmikis and West Pakistan refugees, who were all victims of Srinagar's discriminatory laws. The residents of Jammu felt that Jammu was always ignored for funds and resources, and they hoped the reorganisation would bring in development. Kashmiri Pandit refugees in Jammu hoped for rehabilitation.

Indian reactions

Opposition 

The historian Ramachandra Guha said that the President of India had apparently acted in "haste" and the revocation is an "arbitrary misuse of state power". The constitutional scholar A. G. Noorani said that the Indian government's decision to abrogate Article 370 through controversial means was "utterly and palpably unconstitutional", even fraudulent. It is headed for a "showdown in India's Supreme Court".

Nobel laureate Amartya Sen criticized the government and said that he was "not proud as an Indian". He regarded the detention of Kashmiri political leaders as "a classical colonial excuse" to prevent backlash against the Indian government's decision and called for a democratic solution that would involve Kashmiri people.

Indian novelist Arundhati Roy criticized the Indian government in her opinion piece in The New York Times.

Wajahat Habibullah said the government's decision was a "regressive and unwise" step.

The leaders of the Indian National Congress – India's main opposition party – was divided on the revocation of Article 370. Some Congress leaders such as the Chief Minister of Rajasthan Ashok Gehlot, a congress leader condemned the government's arrest of Kashmiri leaders Mehbooba Mufti and Omar Abdullah. Other leaders of Rajasthan Congress and Gehlot's cabinet welcomed the revocation. Chief Minister of Punjab Amarinder Singh, a congress leader also termed the revocation of Article 370 as "totally unconstitutional" and said "this will set a bad precedent as it would mean that the Centre could reorganise any state in the country by simply imposing President's rule." The Punjab chief minister also banned any form of celebrations or protests in his state in matters relating to Article 370, ordering increased security to some 8,000 Kashmiri students studying in Punjab.

Rahul Gandhi criticized the Indian government for arresting the Kashmiri political leaders and called the detentions "unconstitutional & undemocratic."

On 24 August, a delegation of opposition leaders had attempted to visit Jammu and Kashmir to take stock of the situation. The delegation was a 12-member team composed of Rahul Gandhi, Ghulam Nabi Azad, K. C. Venugopal, Anand Sharma, D. Raja, Sitaram Yechury, Dinesh Trivedi, Tiruchi Siva, Manoj Jha, Sharad Yadav, Majeed Memon, and D. Kupendra Reddy. However, the team was sent back upon reaching Srinagar.

Hundreds of people protested in New Delhi to protest against the Indian government decision and called it a "death of Indian democracy". The protesters asked Indian government to reconsider its decision. D. Raja, General Secretary of the Communist Party of India, called the Indian government move "an assault on Indian constitution". The Tamil Nadu-based regional Dravida Munnetra Kazhagam party leader M. K. Stalin, along with West Bengal-based All India Trinamool Congress party leader Derek O'Brien opposed the revocation. Stalin called the move as "murder of democracy", while O'Brien called it a "procedural harakiri".

The Indian National Congress party members filed two petitions in the Supreme Court of India, requesting an urgent hearing. One challenged the revocation, while the other challenged the communications blackout and curfew in Kashmir region in which approximately 500 people were arrested, including several Kashmiri leaders. The Supreme Court rejected the "urgent hearing" request, placing the petitions to its normal proceedings.

Arjun Sharma, a noted freelance journalist from Jammu penned in his article that while Ladakh was rejoicing the UT status it got after disintegration of J&K, Jammu was suspicious of whether the perceived discrimination towards Jammu will end or not.

Support 

The Indian Government justified its action by saying that this will help end violence and militancy in the state and enable people to access government schemes such as reservation, right to education and right to information among other schemes.

The constitutional expert Subhash C. Kashyap, according to BBC News, states that the revocation was "constitutionally sound" and that "no legal and constitutional fault can be found in it".

The revocation of Article 370 was passed by an overwhelming majority of support in the Indian parliament. It has attracted not only the support of the Hindu nationalist parties such as the BJP, but many other Indian political parties that typically oppose the BJP.

Some senior Congress leaders openly came out in support of the action. Former Indian prime minister Manmohan Singh said that the revocation had an in-principle support from the Congress party but its execution was not appropriate. Bhupinder Singh Hooda, former Chief Minister of Haryana, supported the government's decision saying that the Congress party has "lost its way". Jyotiraditya Scindia, also supported the government's action to remove article 370. He wrote on Twitter, "I support the move on #JammuAndKashmir & #Ladakh and its full integration into union of India." Similarly, Congress leader Deepender Singh Hooda contended that the abrogation of the provisions of Article 370 in Jammu and Kashmir "is in the interest of national integrity". Congress Rajya Sabha chief whip, Bhubaneswar Kalita resigned over Congress's stand on revoking special status of Jammu and Kashmir and stated that, "The ideology of Congress today looks like it is committing suicide and I do not want to be a part of it." Congress politician Janardan Dwivedi welcomed the abrogation of the provisions of Article 370 in Jammu and Kashmir, saying even though it came late, a "historical mistake" had been corrected.

The Bahujan Samaj Party and its leader Mayawati, as well as Aam Aadmi Party leader (and Chief Minister of Delhi) Arvind Kejriwal supported the revocation of Article 370. Explaining her decision to support the revocation, Mayawati stated that Article 370 and 35A had caused social, economic and political injustice in Jammu and Kashmir, and the people – including the Buddhists – will now get the long-pending benefits that was denied to them. She stated, "the Buddhist followers of Ambedkar were feeling happy".

The Telangana and Andhra Pradesh-based YSR Congress Party's parliamentary party leader V. Vijayasai Reddy supported the scrapping of Article 370 and termed the step as a "courageous and daring" step by Amit Shah. Member of Parliament from Telugu Desam Party, Kanakamedala Ravindra Kumar said, "I must congratulate the Home Minister and PM as by strong implementation of this, the people of J&K must be relieved from all this tension and live happily and become a part of the country" and welcomed the move. The Odisha-based Biju Janata Dal and Tamil Nadu-based All India Anna Dravida Munnetra Kazhagam party also supported the revocation of Jammu and Kashmir special status.

Jamiat Ulema-e-Hind, a prominent Indian Muslim organisation, supported the decision to abrogate Article 370 saying that the integration of Kashmir with India is in the interest of Kashmiri people.

Calling it a dynamic place for tourism, the MEPs who visited Kashmir also said that all protests should be against terrorism in the valley, which is mostly from people of foreign countries. During their two-day-stay, the parliamentarians also interacted with the people in the valley, and pointed towards the integration of Kashmir with the beginning of their engagement with the civil society.

Pakistan's response 

From 6 August onward, Pakistan responded in numerous ways. The Foreign Office issued a statement stating India's revocation was an illegal "unilateral step". Pakistan's army chief said that the Pakistan Army would "go to any extent" to support the people of Kashmir. On 7 August, an emergency joint parliamentary sitting passed a resolution to condemn India's move. A meeting of the National Security Committee decided to downgrade Pakistan's diplomatic relations with India. The Samjhauta Express train service and the Thar Express were suspended. All cultural exchanges with India were suspended, including banning the screening of Indian films and dramas inside Pakistan. On 9 August 2019, Pakistan formally suspended most of its trade relations with India. On 11 August 2019, prime minister Imran Khan compared the Indian government to "Nazis", warning that global inaction over Kashmir would be same as "appeasing Hitler". He accused that India was attempting to change the demography of the Muslim majority Kashmir through ethnic cleansing. Pakistan's foreign minister Shah Mehmood Qureshi issued a statement on Tuesday 13 August 2019 that he had written a letter to the president of the United Nations Security Council with a request to convene an emergency meeting of the council to discuss India's "illegal actions that violate UN resolutions on Kashmir". The foreign minister also called for circulation of the letter among members of the Security Council. On 20 August 2019, Pakistan announced that it will take the dispute to the International Court of Justice, adding that its case would centre on alleged human rights violations by India.

On 4 August 2020, Pakistan's government released an updated political map which included Pakistan's territorial claims on Jammu and Kashmir, Ladakh, the Siachen Glacier, the eastern banks of Sir Creek, as well as Junagadh and Manavadar in India's Gujarat region. The map also annotated Ladakh's boundary with China as "frontier undefined", whose status would be formalised by "the sovereign authorities concerned after the settlement of the Jammu and Kashmir dispute." The map was adopted for official use throughout Pakistan. The government renamed the Kashmir Highway, which runs through Islamabad, as Srinagar Highway. On the occasion of the one-year anniversary of the revocation of Kashmir's special status, Pakistan also observed 5 August 2020 as Youm-e-Istehsal ("Day of Exploitation") nationally. Rallies and seminars were arranged to express solidarity with Kashmiris.

China's response

Foreign Ministry spokeswoman Hua Chunying opposed the integration of the Ladakh Union Territory into India's administrative jurisdiction, saying "it undermined China's territorial sovereignty" she went on to say: "India's action is unacceptable and would not have any legal effect," regarding disputed territory on the China–India border. Regarding Kashmir in general, Hua affirmed that "the Kashmir issue is an issue left from the past between India and Pakistan". On 9 August, Chinese Foreign Minister Wang Yi after meeting with Pakistani Foreign Minister Shah Mahmood Qureshi said that China is "seriously concerned about the turbulence and escalating tensions" in Kashmir, and that "China will continue to firmly support the Pakistan side in safeguarding its legitimate rights."

On 12 June 2020, a report said that Chinese think-tank has linked the tensions along the Line of Actual Control (LAC) between India and China with Article 370.

International reactions

  – Former Afghan President Hamid Karzai on Thursday said his country hopes that Indian government's "new measures" will lead to the betterment of people in Jammu and Kashmir, and asked Pakistan to stop using extremist violence as an instrument of policy in the region. Pakistan's ambassador to the United States, Asad Majeed Khan, said that Pakistan might move troops from its border with Afghanistan to its border with India, citing the situation in Kashmir. Dismissing the Pakistani envoy's statement as "misleading", Afghanistan's ambassador to the US Roya Rahmani said that such statements that link the situation in Kashmir to the Afghan peace efforts are "reckless, unwarranted and irresponsible."
  – Australian High Commissioner to India, Harinder Sidhu commented that "The Indian government has said it is an internal matter and we respect the Indian position on that. Australia's long held view on Kashmir has been that this is the issue that should be resolved bilaterally by both India and Pakistan."
  – According to All India Radio, Road Transport and Bridges Minister Obaidul Quader said that "Revocation of Art. 370 for Jammu and Kashmir is an internal matter of India" and that other states "have no right to say anything about others' domestic affairs". On 21 August 2019, Bangladesh officially clarified its position on the abrogation of Article 370 by the Indian Government, saying that this is an internal issue of India.
  – Bhutan fully supported India in the reorganisation of Jammu and Kashmir, and lauded it as very bold, courageous and forward-looking step that will ensure the socio-economic development of Jammu and Kashmir and also bring peace, progress and prosperity to the Union territory. Bhutanese Foreign Minister also said that this is an entirely internal matter of the Government of India.
  – Minister of Foreign Affairs Chrystia Freeland stated that "Canada is concerned about the risk of escalation, infringements on civil rights and reports of detentions."
  – French President Emmanuel Macron said that France believes that the issue of Kashmir should be resolved bilaterally between India and Pakistan, adding that no other party should be involved, after meeting with Indian Prime Minister Modi on 22 August 2019. He also said that France will remain attentive towards ensuring that the "interests and rights" of civilians are duly taken into account on both sides of the Line of Control.
  – Speaking at a news conference in Berlin, Foreign Ministry spokeswoman Maria Adebahr said Germany was closely following developments in the region. "We believe that all further steps of the government must comply with India's Constitution," she said, and urged the government to respect civil rights secured by the law. "We are calling on the Indian government to hold dialogue with the population concerned about its plans, its intentions," Adebahr added. On 24 August 2019, Pakistan's Prime Minister Imran Khan conversed with the German Chancellor Angela Merkel about the situation in Kashmir, emphasising his concerns about "peace and security" and called on the international community to act "urgently".
: The Fidesz Hungarian government in Hungary has expressed support for India on Kashmir and the Citizenship Amendment Act protests.
: In a statement issued during National Assembly session in Kuwait group of lawmakers expressed their concern regarding "abusive legislative and repressive security measures" taken by the Government of India.
  – Foreign Ministry spokesman Abbas Mousavi said Iran "is closely monitoring the Indian government's recent decisions on Jammu and Kashmir, and is carefully listening to the explanations provided by the Indian and Pakistani officials for the recent developments". "Iran expects India and Pakistan, as its regional friends and partners, to take effective steps to serve the interests of people of the region by adopting peaceful approaches and dialogue," he said in statements cited by Iran's Tasnim News Agency. A large number of Iranian students held protest demonstrations outside the Indian embassy in Tehran on 8 August 2019 to denounce the Indian decision to scrap the special status granted to Jammu and Kashmir. Iranian officials on 15 August removed anti-India banners on "Kashmir Solidarity Day" from Pakistan's consulate in the northeastern city of Mashhad. Calling such methods "undiplomatic tactics", Tehran told Islamabad in clear terms that putting such banners against a third country goes against diplomatic norms.
  – Israel said that the scrapping of Article 370 in Jammu and Kashmir is an internal matter of India. Ron Malka, the Israeli ambassador to India said that "As we see it, it's within Indian borders, something that is internal in India, an Indian issue. We know India is the biggest democracy in the world, (it) respects individual rights, respects the rule of law and I am sure India will resolve this issue in democratic ways and in peaceful ways and that's what we are just waiting to see."
  – Prime Minister Mahathir Mohamad expressed concern over the situation in Jammu and Kashmir over a telephone call with Prime Minister of Pakistan Imran Khan. The Foreign Ministry in a statement said "Malaysia is monitoring the situation in Jammu and Kashmir. Malaysia has close and friendly relations with both India and Pakistan. Malaysia encourages the two close neighbouring countries to re-engage in dialogue and negotiations with a view to de-escalate the on-going situation and finding an amicable solution." On the one year anniversary of Kashmir's special status revocation, Mahathir stated that as he was no longer the premier, he could "speak without restrain and address the Kashmir issue", noting the backlash his previous statements had caused in India; offering no apology for his criticism, Mahathir added that "keeping quiet is not an option when all the tell-tale signs were pointing towards another situation whereby a big and powerful country imposed its will with impunity on a small and defenceless nation."
  – An official statement issued by the Government of the Maldives read "The decision taken by the Government of India regarding Article 370 of the Indian Constitution as an internal matter. We believe that it is the right of every sovereign nation to amend their laws as required". Maldives also conveyed their opinion to Pakistan.
  – Poland, which currently holds the presidency of the United Nations Security Council, has said that India and Pakistan should find a solution to the burning Kashmir issue "bilaterally". Speaking to The Indian Express on Monday, Poland's ambassador to India Adam Burakowski said, "Poland hopes that both countries can work out a mutually beneficial solution bilaterally."
  – Russia has called upon both India and Pakistan to save the situation in Kashmir from spiralling out of control and carry out the changes in the region within the constitutional parameters, the change in the status of the state of J&K and its division into two union territories are carried out within framework of the Constitution of the Republic of India. [...] We hope that the differences between them will be resolved by political and diplomatic means on a bilateral basis in accordance with the provisions of the Simla Agreement of 1972 and the Lahore Declaration of 1999," the Ministry of Foreign Affairs said. Russian envoy to India Nikolay Kudashev backed the decision, saying "India's decision (on Jammu and Kashmir) is a sovereign decision which is as per its Constitution. Our position on the issue is totally identical to India's position."
  – Saudi Arabia urged relevant parties in Jammu and Kashmir to maintain peace and stability and to take into account the interests of the inhabitants of the region. On 2 October 2019, media reports stated that Saudi Arabia conveyed to India that it understands the "Indian approach" behind the decision.
  – Prime Minister Ranil Wickremesinghe welcomed the abrogation of Article 370 and the formation of the Ladakh union territory adding that "I understand Ladakh will finally become a Union Territory. With over 70% Buddhist it will be the first Indian state with a Buddhist majority".
  – Ambassador of Thailand to India Chutintorn Sam Gongsakdi said that the annulment of special status to the former state of Jammu and Kashmir by abrogating Article 370 is an "internal affair" of India. During an interview with ETV Bharat, Gongsakdi said, "Thailand does not interfere in the internal affairs of our friendly countries. Our stand has always been that we hope that the parties concerned would be able to resolve any issues between them in an amicable and peaceful manner. We do respect the internal affairs of India". "I have explained in the best possible way to my capital so that they understand the context of India in terms of Jammu, Kashmir and Ladakh Affairs," he said.
  – President Recep Tayyip Erdoğan expressed his concerns over the situation mounting in the region and said he had a telephonic conversation with Prime Minister of Pakistan Imran Khan and that he would get in touch with Prime Minister of India Narendra Modi in hopes to reduce tensions.
  – The UAE Ambassador to India, Ahmed Al Banna, backed the Indian government and said "We expect that the changes would improve social justice and security and confidence of the people in the local governance and will encourage further stability and peace."
  – The Foreign and Commonwealth Office called for calm in the region and issued the following statement "We are following developments closely and support calls for the situation to remain calm". Over 45 UK MPs co-signed a letter and demanded UN Secretary-General António Guterres to intervene and to take notice of Indian government's decision to revoke Article 370. The Labour Party leader Jeremy Corbyn tweeted, "The rights of the Kashmiri people must be respected and UN resolutions implemented." British Prime Minister Boris Johnson conversed with Indian Prime Minister Narendra Modi on 20 August 2019, conveying his regrets about vandalism at the Indian High Commission in London which took place on 15 August. After a similar violent protest took place outside the Indian High Commission in London on 3 September 2019 by pro-Pakistan hooligans and Sikh extremists, Jeremy Corbyn condemned the violent protests and vandalism at the Indian High Commission, and had a telephone call with the Indian High Commissioner to the UK. Earlier, Mayor of London Sadiq Khan condemned the incident and raised it with the police.
  – Morgan Ortagus, a US State Department spokesperson stated there had been no change in the US position with Kashmir continuing to be regarded as a disputed region despite India's characterization of it as an "internal matter" and stressed the need for bilateral talks between India and Pakistan, and further stated "We are concerned about reports of detentions and urge respect for individual rights and discussion with those in affected communities." When asked by reporters if there had been any change in America's policy on Kashmir, State Department spokesperson Morgan Ortagus replied "No. And if there was, I certainly wouldn't be announcing it here, but no, there's not". The US policy has been that Kashmir is a bilateral issue between India and Pakistan and it is up to the two countries to decide on the pace and scope of the talks on the issue. During prime minister Imran Khan's visit to the United States in July 2019, President Donald Trump offered to mediate Kashmir conflict between Pakistan and India. The Bureau of South and Central Asian Affairs of the US State Department in a statement said "the Indian government did not consult or inform the US Government before moving to revoke Jammu and Kashmir's special constitutional status". US President Donald Trump spoke to both Indian and Pakistani Prime Ministers. He emphasised the need to reduce tensions and moderate rhetoric while speaking to the Pakistani PM, after speaking to the Indian PM on 19 August 2019. On 21 August 2019, US President Trump offered to mediate the "explosive" situation in Kashmir, adding that he will meet Prime Minister Narendra Modi at the 45th G7 summit, which was held on 24–26 August 2019. Many Indian American communities welcomed the Indian decision.
  – Zambian President Edgar Chagwa Lungu, during his visit to India, said that Jammu and Kashmir is a bilateral issue between India and Pakistan, in a bilateral meeting with PM Modi. Zambia was the first African nation to react to the decision regarding Jammu and Kashmir.

Organisations

 The European Union said, it is closely monitoring the situation in the region. At a press conference EU spokesperson for foreign affairs, Carlos Martín Ruiz de Gordejuela, stated "Our main message here is that it is very important to avoid any escalation of tension in Kashmir and in the region". A delegation of EU parliament members visited Jammu and Kashmir on 29 October 2019 in their personal capacity, after meeting the Indian Prime Minister, senior officials and state leaders on 28 October.
 The OIC's Contact Group on Jammu and Kashmir expressed "deep concern" over the developments in the region and condemned India's move calling it "illegal and unilateral".
 António Guterres, Secretary-General of the UN, expressed his concern over "restrictions" in Jammu and Kashmir saying that the curbs "could exacerbate the human rights situation in the region". The secretary-general called on all parties to "refrain from taking steps that could affect the status of Jammu and Kashmir" and recalled the 1972 Simla Agreement asked for the final status to be settled by peaceful means. Stéphane Dujarric, the UN spokesperson, expressed concern over India's move to revoke the special status of Kashmir and said that "the United Nations Secretary-General all along maintained that Pakistan and India should resolve all outstanding disputes between the two countries through dialogue including Kashmir." He urged both India and Pakistan to exercise restraint. David Kaye, the UN Special Rapporteur on Freedom of Expression described the communication blackout imposed by India as "unprecedented" and "draconian".
Amnesty International responded that the Indian government's action would "likely to inflame tensions in the area and increase the risk of further human rights violations". It also mentioned that "use of pellet guns and other weapons are in defiance of international human rights standards", after the Indian Supreme Court refused to lift restrictions on Jammu and Kashmir.
Human Rights Watch mentioned that basic freedoms was at risk in Kashmir, and asked India to ensure rights protections in Kashmir and "step back".
Reporters Without Borders reported that Indian-administered Kashmir is cut off from the world and said, "The state of Jammu and Kashmir became a news and information black hole in the space of a single morning yesterday." The organization condemned "the relentless information warfare that Prime Minister Narendra Modi began waging ten days ago by severing all communication in the Kashmir Valley" and called for the immediate restoration of all means of communication.
 Genocide Watch, member and current Coordinator of the Alliance Against Genocide, issued a 'genocide alert' calling upon "the United Nations and its members to warn India not to commit genocide in Kashmir" since it claimed that all the "ten stages of the genocidal process" identified by Gregory Stanton are far advanced and early warnings of "massacres" in the risk factors for genocide are fulfilled.

Non-state actors 

  Taliban – According to The New York Times, the Taliban has warned Pakistan against any meddling and coupling the American–Afghanistan talks to the Kashmir developments. The Taliban states, "Linking the issue of Kashmir with that of Afghanistan by some parties will not aid in improving the crisis at hand because the issue of Afghanistan is not related nor should Afghanistan be turned into the theatre of competition between other countries." The Taliban statement released by Zabiullah Mujahid for the "Islamic Emirate of Afghanistan" also expressed "deep sadness in this [revocation of the autonomous status of Kashmir] regard and urges both India and Pakistan to refrain from taking steps that could pave a way for violence and complications in the region and usurp the rights of Kashmiris".

Demonstrations

Kashmir Valley

On 9 August, according to a Reuters report, over 10,000 people protested in Srinagar against the Indian government's decision to revoke Article 370, with some protesters pelting stones at government security personnel. In response, Indian police used tear gas and pellets against the protesters to disperse them. According to Al Jazeera, it has been receiving information from Srinagar residents via satellite phones and Wi-Fi available in the Kashmir region. They have reported protests on Friday. Clashes were occurring between the protesters and Indian forces, accompanied with pellet gun attack and the firing of tear gas shells by the Indian Forces.Some report that the pellet gun attacks have severely wounded and lacerated civilians.

The Indian government called the Reuters report "completely fabricated and incorrect", but acknowledged that after the Friday mosque prayers, there were "a few stray protests in Srinagar/Baramulla and none involved a crowd of more than 20 people". The Wire said that the visuals published by BBC belie the Government reports.

According to the BBC, it witnessed the police opening gunfire and using tear gas to disperse a crowd in Srinagar after Friday prayers on 9 August 2019. This witness report contradicts the Indian government statement that the "protest never took place". On 11 August, the Jammu and Kashmir director general of police, Dilbag Singh told Reuters, "between 1,000 and 1,500 people were returning from praying at mosques on Friday when 'some miscreants' started pelting stones at security officials", and in a reaction to the stone-pelting, rounds of pump-action gun was fired that caused injuries to a few people. According to Reuters, hundreds of people protested in Srinagar on 11 August, after authorities had eased restrictions in the city over the weekend to allow people to buy groceries, medicines and prepare for the Islamic festival of Eid al-Adha.

Jammu and Ladakh regions

According to India Today, in the Hindu majority Jammu region, people held widespread "massive celebratory" demonstrations over several days with the distribution of sweets, bursting of firecrackers and dancing. In Ladakh, the Buddhist organizations celebrated the removal of Article 370 provisions and making the Ladakh region a separate Union Territory. The people in Leh and Matho celebrated 15 August as a day of "independence from Kashmir" and welcomed their Union Territory status.

In the Kargil region with a Muslim majority, there were protests against the Indian government's move to make it a union territory.

United Kingdom

A number of demonstrations and rallies were organised in London, England after India scrapped autonomous status of Jammu and Kashmir. A large number of protesters demonstrated outside the Indian High Commission in London on 10 August 2019 to express anger over Indian action. There was another demonstration outside the Palace of Westminster on 14 August. A large protest took place outside the Indian High Commission in London the following day, in which Indians celebrating Indian Independence Day were attacked. Eggs, glass bottles, shoes and other objects were thrown at the High Commission and the people celebrating by the anti-India protesters, who were mostly British Pakistanis and Sikh extremists. British Prime Minister Boris Johnson later expressed "regret" over this violent incident, and assured that all necessary steps will be taken to ensure the safety and security of the embassy, its personnel, and visitors.
On 3 September, another violent protest took place outside the Indian High Commission in London, when pro-Pakistan protesters pelted stones and eggs at the High Commission building, causing damage to the premises. London Mayor Sadiq Khan tweeted, "I utterly condemn this unacceptable behaviour and have raised this incident with the Metropolitan Police to take action." The Metropolitan Police made two arrests for causing criminal damage at the Indian High Commission following the incident. British Foreign Secretary Dominic Raab condemned the violence towards British Indians while addressing Parliament.

There were protest demonstrations outside the Indian consulate in Birmingham on 9 August to denounce the Indian revocation of autonomous status of Jammu and Kashmir. Former Member of the British Parliament George Galloway was also part of the protest gathering and demanded a plebiscite in Kashmir.

Canada 

A large number of protesters took to streets in Toronto, Canada on 11 August 2019 in support of the people of Jammu and Kashmir. Demonstrators chanted protest slogans and carried placards. The event description read "Kashmiris do not accept the illegal occupation or unilateral colonial impositions by India. Kashmiris are sovereign Indigenous people who have the right of self-determination and government".

People in Calgary, Canada held a demonstration outside the Calgary City Hall on 8 August 2019 against the clampdown and to support the people of Jammu and Kashmir. The demonstrators said that 800,000 military personnel were deployed in Kashmir and the Internet and communications were blacked out and they did not know what was happening to their families.

United States 

In the week after India announced the revocation, members of the Kashmiri Muslim community, according to the Pakistani newspaper Dawn, held a number of protest demonstrations in the United States in the cities of Washington, D.C., New York, Chicago, Houston, Los Angeles, San Francisco and Seattle against India's removal of autonomous status of Jammu and Kashmir. Protesters also gathered outside the White House on 10 August 2019 and urged Washington to help the people of Kashmir. Pakistan's ambassador Asad Majeed Khan held community events asking the United States to "inject some more sanity on the Indian side". Ghulam Nabi Fai, a Kashmiri diaspora alleged that the Indian plan is "not only to deprive them [Kashmiris] of their rights but to subjugate them through widespread killings and torture", while another protester originally hailing from Srinagar stressed that now was the time for the United States to mediate.

On 25 August 2019, according to India Today, the Kashmiri Pandit community in the US held a rally supporting the decision, saying that Article 370 was "discriminatory" towards minorities in the Kashmir region. At their rally, they told personal stories of their minority status in the Kashmir valley, the religious discrimination against them, their forced exodus in the 1990s, and they wanting to "go back to their homeland [valley]" which they left due to Islamic militancy. At an Atlanta rally, the protestors alleged that the Article 370 was highly discriminatory against the resident "Shias, Dalits, Gujjars, Kashmiri Pandits, Kashmiri Sikhs" in the state, according to India Today.

Bangladesh

Many protest demonstrations have been reported in Bangladesh against the change of autonomous status of Jammu and Kashmir. Pakistan's Abb Takk News channel reported that hundreds protested in Dhaka on 6 August 2019 against the Indian move. Again on 7 August 2019, there was another demonstration in the city of Dhaka where the protesters criticized Narendra Modi and his scrapping of autonomy of Jammu and Kashmir. There was another demonstration on Thursday 8 August 2019 at the University of Dhaka by several Kashmiri students from different educational institutions. There were more protests on 9 August 2019 after Friday prayers which were led by the Kashmir Solidarity Council Bangladesh.

Bahrain

On 12 August 2019, Bahrain took punitive action against a group of Pakistani and Bangladeshi nationals who held a protest on the Kashmir decision the previous day. The protest was conducted after Eid al-Adha prayers in Bahrain illegally. The official Twitter handle of the country's Interior Ministry tweeted about the action taken by the local police to contain the protests and also about the legal proceedings being taken against them. Bahrain authorities further requested its citizens to not exploit religious gatherings to further political motives.

France

Protests were held in Paris, France on 9 August 2019 to denounce Indian step of abrogation of autonomous status of Jammu and Kashmir. The protesters alleged that India was conspiring to change the demography of Kashmir by expelling Kashmiris from their homes and bringing in Hindu settlers from other parts of India.

Australia
Pro-India and anti-India protesters faced off each other in Melbourne, Australia. Kashmiri Pandit groups welcomed India's decision, but the Pakistani community in Australia expressed "deep concern" regarding the situation in Kashmir. Indian groups in Australia said that this is something India has done internally and Pakistan has no right to interfere in India's internal matters.

Germany

Geo News reported that members of the Kashmiri community gathered at the Pariser Platz of Berlin's Brandenburg Gate and protested against India on 11 August 2019.

South Korea

In South Korea, a group of protesters in Seoul who waved Pakistani flags and shouted anti-India slogans—along with abuses towards Modi—were confronted by an Indian delegation including Indian activist Shazia Ilmi. The Indian delegation started to counter the protesters, following which the local police intervened and escorted Shazia Ilmi and her associates from the location.

Social media, activism and misinformation

Several human rights activists and world leaders also commented on their social media accounts about the Kashmir situation. On Twitter, hashtags such as #KashmirBleeds became top trends.

According to India Today and other Indian media sources, several fabricated images and videos have appeared on social media such as Facebook, Twitter and other platforms. A closer examination of these photos and videos established that these are fabricated propaganda that utilized old photos or videos and the posters misrepresent them to be "current situation in Kashmir".

According to Dawn, a Pakistan-based newspaper, the Kashmir blackout has led to an "online misinformation war". The Nation, in its editorial said, "The lack of coverage in Kashmir has increased the likelihood of misinformation and panic being spread, all of which puts the lives of Kashmiris in danger and uncertainty."

The Indian Home Ministry alleged that "several Pakistani handles are spreading fake news", and asked Twitter to block a list of accounts. Separately, the Jammu and Kashmir superintendent of police has demanded Twitter to block an account that allegedly is spreading rumors. The demand letter states that such rumours harm the law and order situation and is a "threat to lives". They allege that the platform is posting "objectionable and malicious" content. Twitter has blocked four of these accounts, and its officials stated that they are reviewing some others. This included the Twitter account of Syed Ali Shah Geelani who is a Kashmiri separatist Hurriyat leader.

Indian government accused the BBC and Reuters of lying and fabricating news about large scale protests in Kashmir, even though they were recorded on video. According to India Today, the authenticity of the BBC video about the protest has been questioned because it is an edited combination of a series of clips and it shows an absence of police and security personnel almost everywhere the edited video, even though Kashmir was under a lockdown with heavy security deployment on 9 August 2019 – the day the video was recorded and posted by the BBC. According to India Today, a portion of the video is authentically from Dullbagh Road in Srinagar, but it is unclear if it is a fresh video or an old video clip inserted in. Some Indians allege that parts of this video are from Pakistan-administered Kashmir.

Impact 
Impact of the Revocation of the special status of Jammu and Kashmir encompassed a year without high-speed Internet, changes in the politics and bureaucracy of the region, priority of counter-insurgency & counter-terrorism operations, new domicile rules, talks of restoration of statehood, judicial lethargy, and decline in stone-pelting among other things.

As per figures collected from Kashmir tourism department, the number of footfalls by tourists counted at its highest 1.8 lakhs in the month of March 2022 (post-abrogation of article 370), which is a record in the past 10 years.

See also
Rape in Kashmir conflict
Human rights abuses in Kashmir
List of massacres in Jammu and Kashmir
 Exodus of Kashmiri Hindus
 Incorporation of Azad Kashmir as nominally self-governing state of Pakistan
 Jammu and Kashmir Reorganisation Act, 2019
 Karachi Agreement (Azad Kashmir)
 Pakistan and state-sponsored terrorism
 Panun Kashmir
 Women's rights in Jammu and Kashmir

Notes

References

Bibliography

External links

 A History of the Kashmir Conflict, The Economist, 17 November 2009.
 Full text of document on govt.’s rationale behind removal of special status to J&K, The Hindu, 5 August 2019.
 What is really going on in Kashmir?, The Washington Post, 23 August 2019.
 The Future of Kashmir, Council on Foreign Relations (panel discussion), 19 November 2019.
 Jammu & Kashmir After Article 370 is Revoked 

2010s in Jammu and Kashmir
2019 in Indian law
2019 in Indian politics
2019 in international relations
August 2019 events in India
Kashmir conflict